Jonathan Cruddas (born 7 April 1962) is a British Labour Party politician who has served as Member of Parliament (MP) for Dagenham and Rainham since 2010, and formerly for Dagenham between 2001 and 2010.

A graduate of the University of Warwick, Cruddas was first elected to Parliament at the 2001 general election. Having been critical of many aspects of the Blair government, he stood for the deputy leadership of the Labour Party in 2007, although he openly stated he did not wish to become Deputy Prime Minister. Despite winning the most votes in the first round of voting, he was eliminated in the penultimate round of the contest.

Cruddas ruled himself out of the 2010 leadership election, saying he would rather influence policy. In 2012, Cruddas was appointed to Ed Miliband's Shadow Cabinet, replacing Liam Byrne as Policy Coordinator.

In August 2022 Cruddas announced his intention to retire from Parliament at the next General Election.

Early life and education 
Cruddas was born in Helston, Cornwall to John, a sailor, and Pat (a native  of County Donegal, Ireland). Cruddas was educated at the Oaklands Roman Catholic Comprehensive School, Waterlooville, Portsmouth, before attending the University of Warwick where he ultimately received an M.A. and a Ph.D. in Industrial and Business Studies in 1991, writing a thesis entitled An analysis of value theory, the sphere of production and contemporary approaches to the reorganisation of workplace relations. He was a Visiting Fellow of the University of Wisconsin–Madison from 1987 to 1989.

Cruddas is a visiting fellow at Nuffield College, Oxford (2016–present), and is also a visiting professor at the University of Leicester (2016–present), primarily involved with the Centre for Sustainable Work and Employment Futures.

Early career
In 1989, he became a policy officer for the Labour Party before being appointed Senior Assistant to Labour Party General Secretary Larry Whitty in 1994, remaining in that position when Tom Sawyer became General Secretary that same year. After the 1997 general election, he was employed as Deputy Political Secretary to newly elected Prime Minister Tony Blair. His main role was to be a liaison between the Prime Minister and the trade unions, with whom Blair had often had a difficult relationship. In this role, he also worked heavily on the introduction of the minimum wage.

Political career

Cruddas was selected to be the prospective parliamentary candidate for the safe Labour seat of Dagenham in 2000, after the sitting MP Judith Church announced that she would be retiring. He was elected as the MP for Dagenham the following year at the 2001 general election, with a majority of 8,693 votes.

From the backbenches, Cruddas quickly became a vocal critic of the government for what he saw as their ignoring of their traditional, working-class support in a bid to be more appealing to middle-class voters. He rebelled against the government on a number of occasions; including on the introduction of university top-up fees, the legislation on asylum seekers, the introduction of trust schools, proposals to renew the UK Trident nuclear weapons system, and foundation trusts. He supported both the Fourth Option for direct investment in council housing and the Trade Union Freedom Bill.

Cruddas was re-elected at the 2005 general election, but his Dagenham constituency was abolished in boundary changes for the 2010 general election. Cruddas chose to contest the newly created constituency of Dagenham and Rainham, which was notionally marginal. He won the seat by 2,630 votes in a close-run election campaign, which was a seat that the British National Party had heavily targeted. This resulted in a large number of anti-fascist organisations not affiliated to the Labour Party, such as Hope not Hate, campaigning for Cruddas to resist the BNP. After being elected, he took up a part-time position teaching Labour history at University College, Oxford, from 2010 to 2012.

Deputy leadership election

On 27 September 2006, Cruddas announced his intention to stand to become Deputy Leader of the Labour Party once the incumbent, John Prescott, stood down. He said he did not want to be Deputy Prime Minister, but instead wished to act as a "transmission belt" with the grassroots of the party. In interviews, Cruddas also said that he did not want the "trappings or baubles" that would potentially come with the job of Deputy Prime Minister, such as use of the Dorneywood weekend country residence.

Cruddas accrued nominations from 49 MPs and received strong union backing, including Amicus and the Transport and General Workers' Union. He received backing from former Deputy Leader Roy Hattersley, then Mayor of London Ken Livingstone, NUS President Gemma Tumelty, and former National Executive Committee member, actor and presenter Tony Robinson. The left-wing magazine Tribune endorsed him as "the change that is required".

On 24 June 2007, it was announced that Harriet Harman had won the election, although Cruddas gained the highest proportion of votes in the first round. He was ultimately eliminated in the fourth round of voting, coming third behind Harman and Alan Johnson. He had secured the highest number of votes from members of affiliated organisation in every round before his elimination.

Policy Review Coordinator
Touted by some media sources as a potential candidate for the leadership of the Labour Party, he ruled himself out of the 2010 leadership election and said he did not want the job; but instead wanted to influence policy. In 2012, Cruddas was appointed to Ed Miliband's Shadow Cabinet, replacing Liam Byrne as Labour Party Policy Coordinator.

On 15 May 2012, Labour Leader Ed Miliband offered Cruddas a position in his Shadow Cabinet as Labour's Policy Coordinator, with a view to crafting Labour's manifesto for the 2015 general election. Cruddas accepted the offer, saying that it had always been his wish to influence policy.

The Future of Work Commission 
The Future of Work Commission was announced at the 2016 Labour Party Annual Conference in Liverpool. The goal of the commission is to make a set of achievable policy recommendations, which will be delivered in a report in September 2017 at Labour Annual Conference in Brighton. Jon Cruddas MP is one of the Commissioners working on the project.

Since 2018 
Cruddas narrowly retained his seat at the 2019 general election, with a hugely reduced majority, winning by 293 votes over the Conservative candidate. He supported Lisa Nandy for Labour Leader in the 2020 Labour Party leadership election.

In August 2022 Cruddas announced his intention to retire from Parliament at the next General Election. 
He expressed optimism about Labour's chances of winning this.

Political views 

Cruddas's deputy leadership challenge was based on the precepts contained in a pamphlet called 'Fit for purpose: A programme for Labour Party renewal', co-authored with journalist John Harris and funded by the pressure group Compass. Cruddas won a Compass membership poll in March 2007, gaining 53% of first preference votes among the deputy leadership candidates. In terms of his relative position within the Labour Party, newspapers have described Cruddas as "left wing"; however, he has also been described as "modernising centre-left", and more recently has become associated with the socially conservative Blue Labour tendency and has formed a political partnership with James Purnell. He described himself as "mistaken" over his decision to vote for British participation in the 2003 invasion of Iraq and has criticised his party's record on immigration, saying that "we had too many people coming too fast", and that "immigration has been used as a 21st century incomes policy, and protections in terms of the labour market have not been substantial enough."

After speculation that Cruddas, a Catholic, was in favour of restricting abortion, he re-affirmed his pro-choice position. In an interview concerning Cruddas' faith, he stated "in our family the political heroes weren't Gaitskell or Bevan. They were the Kennedys because they were Irish, there was Óscar Romero because liberation theology was quite a big thing, and Pope John. So I joined the Labour Party, and my brother joined the Carmelites. The Labour Party always seemed to me to be a rational, natural element within some of those things we were brought up to believe in. It was as simple as that. My family was part of the Diaspora, they were all over the world, and again that returned to certain issues of solidarity. So there was always that seamless thing between faith and political agency, and union activity as well, forged out of the politics of Irish immigration".

The Times Guide to the House of Commons describes him as "a well-liked and well-respected left winger who took on the BNP and won".

Jon Cruddas was one of 36 Labour MPs to nominate Jeremy Corbyn as a candidate in the Labour leadership election of 2015. However, he later supported Owen Smith in the failed attempt to replace Corbyn in the 2016 Labour Party leadership election.

In 2023 Cruddas publicly revealed his opposition to ULEZ expansion that was decided by Sadiq Khan calling it "an unwelcome hit on working people".

He is a member of Labour Friends of Israel.

Personal life
Cruddas married Labour activist Anna Healy (now Baroness Healy of Primrose Hill) in 1992; the couple have one son, Emmett Cruddas. His wife worked as a special adviser to Harriet Harman, and had previously worked for Labour MPs Jack Cunningham, Mo Mowlam and Gus Macdonald. He lives in Notting Hill.

In October 2012, Cruddas was banned from driving for eight weeks, for driving with no MOT or insurance.

Selected bibliography

Books
  Pdf.
 
 
 
 
 
Cruddas, Jon (2021). The Dignity of Labour. London: Polity Press. ISBN 1509540792

Journal articles

News articles

References

External links

 
 Interview: Jon Cruddas, bbc.co.uk, 2 March 2007
 Brits to the Fascist BNP: "Not in My Name", huffingtonpost.com, 13 July 2009
 "Who is Jon Cruddas?", guardian.co.uk, 27 September 2010

|-

|-

1962 births
Alumni of the University of Warwick
English Roman Catholics
English people of Irish descent
Labour Friends of Israel
Labour Party (UK) MPs for English constituencies
Labour Party (UK) officials
Living people
People educated at Oaklands Catholic School
People from Helston
People from Waterlooville
Spouses of life peers
UK MPs 2001–2005
UK MPs 2005–2010
UK MPs 2010–2015
UK MPs 2015–2017
UK MPs 2017–2019
UK MPs 2019–present